The Colts Neck Inn is a steakhouse located on County Route 537 in what is now Colts Neck Township, New Jersey. Established as the Colts Neck Tavern in 1717, the inn became known as the Colts Neck Hotel before becoming a restaurant. A separate Colts Neck Inn Hotel was incorporated in 1997.

History
The Colts Neck Inn claims on its commercial sign that it was established as a tavern about 1717, but documentation of the inn's actual founding date is unavailable. The tavern was a stopover for stagecoaches and messengers traveling the post road between Freehold and Perth Amboy, New Jersey.

Tavern
Levi Hart (?-1775), of England, settled in the village of Colts Neck, then part of Freehold Township, New Jersey, in about 1735 and set himself up as the tavern keeper. His place became known as Hart's Tavern. (His Jewish heritage led the British to mark Colts Neck on their Battle of Monmouth map as Jewstown.) After Levi died in 1775, his widow, Catherine (Applegate) Hart, owned the tavern. She remarried in 1778 to Joshua Huddy, who became involved in local activities against Loyalists during the first years of the American Revolution. He was often in court as a defendant and at one point the Monmouth County sheriff had to intervene in a dispute in which Huddy allegedly attempted to wrest ownership of the tavern from his wife and put her and the children on the street. (Note: By September 1780, Huddy was living in a Colts Neck house that would later belong to Thomas G Haight, the father of US Congressman and New Jersey Assemblyman Charles Haight, of Freehold. This is where Colonel Tye and his band of Loyalists attempted to capture and kill Huddy.) Jacob Hart took over for his mother and ran the tavern until 1817.

Samuel Laird (1 February 1787 - 5 July 1859) replaced Jacob Hart as proprietor of the tavern in 1817 and served in that role until his death in 1859. Samuel served as the first postmaster of Colts Neck when a post office was opened on 24 February 1824. Samuel was running the tavern when Colts Neck became part of Atlantic Township in 1857.

Samuel Laird trained race horses while operating the tavern. Prominent among the horses was the thoroughbred Fashion, which was owned by William Gibbons and which Samuel's son Joseph T. Laird rode for all engagements. Joseph was known as the best jockey on the US East Coast at the time. Fashion's big race was at the Union Course on Long Island, New York on 10 May 1842 against a horse named Boston.

Samuel's son Robert Laird ran the tavern from the time of his father's death until 1869. Augustus Manning took over, followed by several unknown proprietors. As of 1885, Monroe Matthews ran the tavern.

Samuel's father, Robert Laird (7 Apr 1758 - 3 June 1811), established Laird & Company, a distillery adjacent to the tavern and operated it from 1780 until his death in 1811. Cited as the oldest licensed distillery in the United States, Laird & Company produced and sold applejack from this location until the distillery burned to the ground in 1849. Samuel Laird's son Robert,  who was operating the distillery at the time of the fire, rebuilt it in nearby Scobeyville, New Jersey, where it remains today.

Hotel
Frederick Luther was operating the hotel when he sold it to Louis V. Snyder of Long Branch, New Jersey in December 1908. The inn, which had more than 25 guest rooms, stables for 25 horses, and several acres of land at the time, was said to be the only hotel between Eatontown and Freehold, New Jersey. Luther planned to retire and engage in the horse business. Snyder would take over the business in March 1909.

The hotel was incorporated as a separate business in 1997. Peter Mavrookas was President of the corporation as of 2003.  

The hotel had 47 guest rooms as of October 2016.

Inn
Arthur Ruffalo and his brother, Joseph Ruffalo, were partners in the Colts Neck Inn in the mid-1960s. The Inn was sold to George Mavrookas in 1973. The family of the new owner continues to control the business as of October 2017.

References

External links
 
 Colts Neck Inn Hotel website
 History of Colts Neck
 Laird & Company - Colts Neck Inn
 Laird & Company - Joe Laird Rides Fashion
 Colts Neck Survives as a Fount of Applejack (New York Times, 28 October 1973)
 Joshua Jack Huddy
 Making the American Thoroughbred

Steakhouses in the United States
Restaurants in New Jersey
Taverns in New Jersey
Hotels in New Jersey
Colts Neck Township, New Jersey
Taverns in the American Revolution
1717 establishments in New Jersey
Buildings and structures in Monmouth County, New Jersey
Tourist attractions in Monmouth County, New Jersey